Hawarden Bridge railway station is a railway station near Shotton, Flintshire, Wales. The station and all trains serving it are operated by Transport for Wales.

History
The station was opened by the LNER on 22 September 1924 as Hawarden Bridge Halt, adjacent to the John Summers steelworks. The station was renamed as Hawarden Bridge in 1954 when it was upgraded.

The Chester line closed to passengers in September 1968, but remained open for freight until June 1992 (it is now a footpath and cycleway) whilst the shutdown of much of the works in 1980 (with the loss of 6,000 jobs) led to a significant decline in use of the station.

The signal box to the north of Dee Marsh Junction remains in use to control access to the remnants of the former Shotwick Sidings for the dispatch of finished steel products. The sidings were once used by heavy trains of iron ore from Bidston Dock in Birkenhead bound for the sidings Shotwick. An industrial park and rail-connected paper mill now occupy part of the old Shotton works site, whilst the rolling mill there is still operational receiving steel coil for processing from South Wales by rail. The signal box also acts as the 'fringe' to the Merseyside Integrated Electronic Control Centre at Sandhills.

It is situated immediately to the north of the Hawarden Bridge railway swing bridge that last opened in 1960.

Facilities
The station is unmanned and only has basic amenities (CIS screens, waiting shelters and timetable poster boards on each platform).  Step-free access is available to both platforms, but transfer between them requires the use of a barrow crossing. The Chester Millennium Greenway cycle route runs adjacent to the station and provides access to the northbound platform. The route also connects the station to Shotton.

The station's name in Welsh is Pont Penarlâg. The name is announced on Welsh station announcements, however, despite the station being located in Wales, it is not displayed on the platform signage.

Services
The station sees an infrequent service, with the only trains calling during the morning and evening peak periods towards Wrexham Central southbound and Bidston northbound. There are four southbound (all on request) and five northbound trains a day Monday to Saturday. In May 2013, Arriva Trains Wales introduced a Sunday service at the station. On a Sunday, all passenger services (every 90 minutes) on the Borderlands Line will stop, on request.

References

Bibliography

External links

Railway stations in Flintshire
DfT Category F2 stations
Former London and North Eastern Railway stations
Railway stations in Great Britain opened in 1924
Railway stations served by Transport for Wales Rail
Railway request stops in Great Britain